The Silver River is a  stream in the Upper Peninsula in the U.S. state of Michigan.

References 

Rivers of Michigan
Rivers of Baraga County, Michigan
Rivers of Houghton County, Michigan
Tributaries of Lake Superior